El Tesoro is a resort in the Maldonado Department of southeastern Uruguay.

Geography
The resort is located on Ruta Interbalnearia, on the east bank of Arroyo Maldonado, just across San Rafael - El Placer, with which it is connected by a bridge famous for its architecture, the Puente de Barra de Maldonado. It borders the resort La Barra to the south.

Population
In 2011 El Tesoro had a population of 1,396 permanent inhabitants and 990 dwellings.
 
Source: Instituto Nacional de Estadística de Uruguay

References

External links
INE map of El Tesoro, La Barra, Laguna Blanca, Manantiales and El Chorro

Populated places in the Maldonado Department
Seaside resorts in Uruguay